Stir-crazy is an alternate idiom for cabin fever, a negative reaction caused by prolonged confinement.

Stir Crazy may also refer to:

Stir Crazy (film), a 1980 comedy film
Stir Crazy (restaurant), a US restaurant chain
Stir Crazy (TV series), a short-lived 1985 CBS sitcom
"Stir Crazy", a song by the indie rock band Redlight Cinema
"Stir Crazy", a song by The Madd Rapper, featuring Eminem